Francesco Maria Giannotti (1635 – April, 1699) was a Roman Catholic prelate who served as Bishop of Segni (1682–1699).

Biography
Francesco Maria Giannotti was born in Rome, Italy in 1635, He was ordained a deacon on 26 April 1682 and as a priest on 1 May 1682. On 4 May 1682, he was appointed during the papacy of Pope Innocent XI as Bishop of Segni. On 14 June 1682, he was consecrated bishop. He served as Bishop of Segni until his death in April 1699.

Episcopal succession
While bishop, he was the principal co-consecrator of:

References

External links and additional sources
 (for Chronology of Bishops) 
 (for Chronology of Bishops)  

17th-century Italian Roman Catholic bishops
Bishops appointed by Pope Innocent XI
1635 births
1699 deaths